

"It's Raining, It's Pouring" is an English language nursery rhyme and children's song. It has a Roud Folk Song Index number of 16814.

Origins
The first two lines of this rhyme can be found in The Little Mother Goose, published in the US in 1912. The melody is associated with "A Tisket, A Tasket" and "What Are Little Boys Made Of?"

The earliest known audio recording of the song was made in 1939 in New York by anthropologist and folklorist Herbert Halpert and is held in the Library of Congress. Charles Ives added musical notes 1939, and a version of it was copyrighted in 1944 by Freda Selicoff.

The poem goes as follows:

It's raining, it's pouring,
The old man is snoring,
He bumped his head and went to bed,
And couldn't get up in the morning.

Interpretation

It has been suggested that the verse is a "classic description" of a head injury ("bumped his head"), followed by a lucid interval and an inability to resume normal activity ("didn't get up in the morning"). Andrew Kaye in Essential Neurosurgery suggested that, in regard to the first verse at least, the rhyme is an interpretation of an accidental death ("didn't get up in the morning"; indicating that no attempt or ability to get up was made).

References

American nursery rhymes
Songs about weather
Year of song unknown
Songwriter unknown